Orwa Nyrabia (born 16 December 1977) is an independent documentary film festival artistic director, producer, filmmaker, trainer, human rights defender and co-founder of DOX BOX International Documentary Film Festival in Syria. Nyrabia is a resident of Berlin, Germany, since the end of 2013  In January 2018 Nyrabia became the director of International Documentary Film Festival Amsterdam (IDFA).

Education and career

Nyrabia graduated with a degree of acting from the Higher Institute for Dramatic Arts in Damascus, Syria. From 1997 to 2002, Nyrabia wrote regularly for Lebanese daily As-Safir. In 2004, he starred in Yousry Nasrallah's "The Gate of Sun". The film, an adaptation of Elias Khoury's novel with the same name, was screened at the 2004 Cannes Film Festival. Nyrabia also worked on several feature films as a first assistant director.

The festival started with screenings in Damascus cinemas but from 2009 on screenings were expanded to other Syrian cities including Homs and Tartus. Along with the annual festival, many workshops and activities were offered to young Syrian filmmakers. His work with DOX BOX earned him and his partner, Diana El Jeiroudi, several awards including the Katrin Cartlidge Award and the European Documentary Award in 2012.

The most significant of the films Nyrabia produced was the 2008 documentary Dolls, A Woman from Damascus, by Diana El Jeiroudi, the film was screened in over 40 countries around the world, on Television, in festivals and Art exhibitions.

In 2013, while residing in Egypt., Nyrabia produced the documentary film Return to Homs, by Syrian filmmaker Talal Derki, and the film became the very first film from the Arab World to open the prestigious IDFA, in November 2013., Return To Homs won many awards including the Grand Jury Prize of 2014 Sundance Film Festival.

In 2014, he was one of the producers of the highly acclaimed film Silvered Water, Syria Self-Portrait, directed by seasoned Syrian filmmaker Ossama Mohammed in collaboration with Wiam Simav Bedirxan , premiered at the Cannes Film Festival Official Selection, and received highest critical claim by major outlets such as Le Monde and Variety. Nyrabia's success in 2014 was highlighted by CBS's show 60 Minutes on December 15, 2014.

Nyrabia served on the juries of many international film festivals and funds, including IDFA, Prince Claus Fund and Dok Leipzig, among others. He also worked as a documentary film tutor at various prestigious workshops, such as the IDFA Academy  and the Encounters documentary workshop in Cape Town, South Africa. In June 2017, Nyrabia, together with his partner Diana El Jeiroudi, were the very first Syrians to be invited as members of the Academy of Motion Picture Arts and Sciences.

Activism 
Nyrabia's role in the drafting of the Syrian filmmakers' international Call in late April 2011, which is the Syrian uprising's first public statement by a professional group, is known to be central. The call was signed by over 70 Syrian filmmakers, inviting filmmakers around the world to join in demanding democracy for Syria. Stars like Juliette Binoche, Mohsen Makhmalbaf. Mike Leigh were among more than one thousand international film professionals who joined the call.

Nyrabia has been one of the unnamed people behind Syria's most famous grassroots revolutionary organization, Local Coordination Committees  in Syria, working on activists’ support and humanitarian aid to displaced citizens. Arabic media praised Nyrabia for his role in humanitarian work, mainly to displaced civilians from Homs,.
It is known that Nyrabia worked closely with renowned Syrian opposition figures and activists, such as Riad Seif and Razan Zaitouneh. 
Nyrabia's father, Mouaffaq Nyrabia, is also a known Leftist political dissident, previously detained by the Syrian authorities, and has been the National Coalition for Syrian Revolutionary and Opposition Forces's representative to the EU in the years 2013-2015 and then the Coalition's Vice President in 2016.

Since Razan Zaitouneh was abducted late 2013 in Douma, near Damascus, by an unknown group of extremists, Nyrabia became the temporary Acting Director of the organization she founded and directed, Center for Documentation of Violations in Syria (VDC).

Detention
Nyrabia was reportedly arrested at Damascus International Airport by Syrian authorities on 23 August 2012. His family lost contact with him shortly before he was supposed to board an EgyptAir flight to Cairo. The airline company confirmed that Nyrabia did not board their flight. He was reportedly released on 12 September.
Later on, Nyrabia announced on his personal Facebook page that the Syrian Military Intelligence was responsible for his detention. Nyrabia was released following an international filmmakers' campaign for his freedom, in which thousands of film professionals from around the world demanded his freedom in the media. These included Robert De Niro, Robert Redford, Charlotte Rampling, Kevin Spacey, Juliette Binoche and many others. The campaign was a rare example of successful pressure on the Syrian government, as it was the reason why he was released without charges. Following his release, Nyrabia published a letter of thanks to everybody who participated in the campaign

References

External links

DOX BOX International Documentary Film Festival in Syria
Proaction Film
Violations Documentation Center

1977 births
Living people
Syrian film directors
Syrian writers
Syrian male film actors
Syrian film producers
People from Homs
Higher Institute of Dramatic Arts (Damascus) alumni
Documentary film producers
Syrian documentary filmmakers